Hans Reinhold von Fersen (2 March 1683 Tallinn – 25 May 1736 Stockholm) was a Swedish count, politician and soldier. He served as lieutenant general from 1720 and as president of the Svea Court of Appeal from 1731.

He was the son of count Reinhold Johan von Fersen and Anna Sophia von Ungern-Sternberg. In 1715 he himself married countess Eleonora Margareta Wachtmeister, daughter of the royal counsellor Axel Wachtmeister. They had two children:
 Carl Reinhold von Fersen (7 April 1716, Stockholm – 7 May 1786, Stockholm)
 Fredrik Axel von Fersen (5 April 1719 – 24 April 1794)

References

1683 births
1736 deaths
17th-century Estonian people
18th-century Estonian people
Baltic-German people
Swedish nobility
Estonian nobility
Swedish politicians
Swedish generals
Estonian people of Swedish descent
Politicians from Tallinn
Hans Reinhold